KWKJ is a radio station airing a country music format licensed to Windsor, Missouri, broadcasting on 98.5 MHz FM.  The station is owned by D & H Media, LLC.

References

External links

Country radio stations in the United States
WKJ